Caicó, also known as the City of Prince, is a municipality in the Seridó Ocidental microregion and Central Potiguar mesoregion, in Rio Grande do Norte state, Northeast Brazil. With a population of 80,726 inhabitants (2021), it is the seventh most populous city of Rio Grande do Norte and the second in the countryside of the state, after Mossoró.

Located between the Seridó and Barra Nova rivers, in the eastern portion of Western Seridó, the city has the highest human development index of the Semi-arid Northeast Brazil. Founded in 1735 as Vila Nova do Príncipe, the city has evolved into a political and cultural centre of Rio Grande do Norte. The name Caicó is derived from the indigenous word Queicuó, meaning 'Cuó river and mountain'.

History 
The settlement was made initially by migrants of Pernambuco in search of land for cattle ranching, since the Royal Charter of 1701 prohibited cattle on the coast. Were awarded land grants as rewards for military shapes such as the expulsion of the Dutch and for priests, with the construction of the chapel in honor of St. Anne in 1695. In 1700 gave up the foundation of the Camp Queiquó by Manuel de Souza Forte. However the first families to settle fully took place from 1720, by Portuguese coming mainly from northern Portugal and the Azores.

Geography

Climate 
Caicó has a hot semi-arid climate (Köppen climate classification BSh), subject to variability, and the dry periods (droughts) may last more than one year. There are about 3,000 hours of average sunshine annually. Beside Mossoró and Pau dos Ferros, both in Western Rio Grande do Norte, Caicó is one of the hottest cities in the state with temperatures reaching up to  during the day.

Demographics 
The 2010 census had the municipality's population as 62,709, with a density of 53,9 persons per km². Caicó's median age of 27, as well as its percentage of seniors are above the state average and the national average, while those under 15 are below Brazilian percentages. Around 92% describe themselves as Christian, with Catholics account for 70,4% of the population and members of Protestant churches is 25,3%. The city is the seat of the Protestant Church of Brazil. Ethnically, 98% are white, 1% mixed, 0,78% black, and 0,22 % Asian.

References

External links
Official website
Caicó in a RN road map
Weather in Caicó-RN
Getty Thesaurus entry for Caicó
Information about Dioecesis Caicoënsis

Municipalities in Rio Grande do Norte